The Bloemfontein Conference was a meeting that took place at the railway station of Bloemfontein, capital of the Orange Free State from 31 May until 5 June 1899. The main issue dealt with the status of British migrant workers called "Uitlanders", who mined the gold fields in Transvaal.

The conference was initiated by Orange Free State president Martinus Theunis Steyn, in order to settle differences between Transvaal President Paul Kruger and British High Commissioner Alfred Milner. It was considered a last effort at reconciliation to prevent war between the two factions.

At the conference, Milner made three demands from Kruger:
 Enactment by Transvaal of a law that would immediately give Uitlanders enfranchisement and the right to vote.
 Use of the English language in the Volksraad of the South African Republic (Transvaal Parliament).
 All laws of the Volksraad would need to be approved by the British Parliament.

Kruger considered these demands an impossibility, however he was willing to reduce the period of Uitlander enfranchisement from the present fourteen years to seven years. Milner refused to compromise his original demands and, despite encouragement from British Colonial Secretary Joseph Chamberlain for him to continue the talks, Milner walked out of the conference on 5 June and no resolution concerning the fate of the Uitlanders was reached.

At this time, Milner composed a diatribe called the "Helot's Dispatch", which lambasted the Transvaal as a force that "menaces the peace and prosperity of the world".  On 11 October 1899, the Second Boer War began.

See also
 History of the Cape Colony from 1870 to 1899

References

External links
 Origins of the Boer War by Garrett Moritz

1899 in the Orange Free State
Bloemfontein
Second Boer War